The Jaguar F-Type (X152) is a series of two-door, two-seater grand tourers manufactured by British car manufacturer Jaguar Land Rover under their Jaguar Cars marque since 2013. The car's JLR D6a platform is based on a shortened version of the XK's platform. It is the so-called "spiritual successor" to the famous E-Type.

The car was launched initially as a 2-door soft-top convertible, with a 2-door fastback coupé version launched in 2013.

The F-Type underwent a facelift for the 2021 model year. It was unveiled in December 2019, featuring a significantly restyled front end and dashboard, and simplified drivetrain options.

XJ41/XJ42 concept (1986)

The F-Type name was first used on a pair of completely unrelated concepts as far back as 1982, when Jaguar realised that the XJ-S had grown too large in size and weight to be classed as a proper successor to the E-Type. Then, two new projects, codenamed the XJ41 (coupé) and XJ42 (convertible) got to an advanced state of development. However, the project was cancelled when Ford Motor Company took over Jaguar in 1989, and the newly installed management determined that upgrading the company's dated production facilities was a higher priority. The XJ-S was given a major facelift (being renamed the XJS) instead as a stop gap solution. The XJ41/XJ42 studies ultimately evolved into the Aston Martin DB7 and the Jaguar XK8 which were launched in 1994 and 1996 respectively.

F-Type concept (2000)

The F-Type concept was a two-seat speedster with a 3.0-litre V6 engine from the S-Type saloon conceived to compete against light weight sports cars, such as the Porsche Boxster. Geoff Lawson, Jaguar's Head of Design, had been working on the development of the car, leading a team of three designers namely Keith Helfet, Adam Hatton and Pasi Pennanen. His sudden death in 1999 led Ian Callum, the new Head of Design, to continue the project who would present the finalised concept car to the general public at the 2000 Detroit Auto Show to a positive response due to its retro styling which recalled Jaguar automobiles of the 1950s and 60s. At its introduction, the car was quoted to be available with a manual or automatic transmission and an optional all-wheel-drive system. Budget cuts by parent company Ford led Jaguar to pursue its efforts in Formula-One and by 2002, the F-Type project was cancelled due to its failure to meet production feasibility.

C-X16 concept (2011)

The C-X16 concept takes cues from the 2010 C-X75 plug-in hybrid concept sports car, including the shape of the front grille and the wrap-around rear lights, along with a side-hinged opening rear window reminiscent of the 1961 E-Type fastback coupé.

The concept car was unveiled at the 2011 Frankfurt Motor Show. Jaguar stated that the C-X16 was their smallest car since the 1954 Jaguar XK120, at:  length;  width;  height.

The F-Type which was previewed stylistically by the C-X16, was developed under the project code "X152".

Production variants

F-Type Convertible (2013–present)

The convertible version of F-Type was first unveiled at Sundance, London which was followed by a presentation at the 2012 Paris Motor Show and the 2013 Goodwood Festival of Speed (with a bare chassis).

F-Type Coupé (2014–present)

The coupé variant of the F-Type was unveiled at the 2013 Los Angeles Auto Show (F-Type R Coupé) and 2013 Tokyo Motor Show, followed by 2013 Jaguar Academy of Sport Annual Awards, an exclusive event in Canary Wharf, London.

The coupé went on sale in spring 2014. Launch models scheduled include the F-Type, F-Type S and F-Type R.

F-Type SVR (2016–2020)

At the Geneva Motor Show in March 2016, Jaguar unveiled the F-Type SVR. The F-Type SVR was discontinued in 2020.

F-Type SVR GT4 (2018-present)
The Jaguar F-Type SVR GT4 is a race car made for the 2018-19 British GT Championship. Invictus Games was created by Prince Harry, The Duke of Sussex as an international adaptive multi-sport event for wounded, injured or sick armed services personnel. In 2018 Invictus Racing was set up to offer those in the armed forces who had suffered, the opportunity to compete in the 2018-19 British GT Championship. To make this happen James Holder, co-founder of the clothing brand Superdry, the Invictus Games Foundation and Jaguar's Special Vehicle Operations department collaborated to create a race team using two specially developed F-Types. The team was to be run by the very successful David Appleby Engineering.

2018 was a very steep learning curve in the very competitive British GT Championship and 2019 the rewards came with GT4 Pro/Am class wins at Oulton Park in races 1 and 2, and 2nd at Snetterton and Spa.

Both cars campaigned in 2018 and in 2019 the attention was focused on the one car with the other being used for testing purposes.

Facelift (2019)
The facelifted F-Type was unveiled in December 2019 with design and technological updates. On the exterior, it received new Pixel LED headlamps, new slender taillamps, 10-spoke 20-inch wheels, and a choice of new exterior paint finishes. Interior features include a new 12.3-inch reconfigurable TFT instrument cluster and a 10-inch Touch Pro infotainment system. The V6 engine option is now only available in North American markets, with the SVR variant discontinued. The lineup now consists of the following models:

F-Type P300

F-Type P380

F-Type P450

F-Type R P575

Technical details

Chassis
The F-Type utilises an all-aluminium unitary chassis, assembled with flush rivets and glue. Sound and vibration insulation is provided by the addition of a special underbody tray and engine mounts, and a double bulkhead between the engine bay and passenger compartment. The convertible roof is an electrically operated retractable fabric piece. Jaguar says by eschewing metal it can keep the car's centre of gravity low, while a Thinsulate layer means thermal and sound insulation is akin to a solid roof.

Powertrain
The layout is front-engine, rear-wheel-drive, or all-wheel drive which is standard on the F-Type SVR and P575, optional on the P380 and P450. The gearbox is an eight-speed automatic with paddle-shifters offering manual override. In 2015, a ZF six-speed manual became available as an option on the V6 models. There is a mechanical limited-slip differential on the V6 S and an electronic limited-slip differential on the V8.

In 2018, a 2.0 L turbocharged Inline-4 engine was added as the new entry-level powertrain, which is Jaguar's first four-cylinder sports car.

Suspension
The F-Type has a double-wishbone front and rear suspension with adaptive dampers and adjustable suspension settings to allow the driver to adjust ride and handling. The car has a total of 25 different driving modes programmed to suit different road conditions and driving styles.

Interior

The interior of the F-Type has a two-seater setup with the leather upholstery and control buttons finished in aluminium. There is a touchscreen display in the centre console and another TFT display between the dials in the instrument panel. There is also a choice of flat-bottom or Alcantara finish for the three-spoke steering wheel and buttons finished in soft-feel matte black.

Equipment
The F-Type debuted a stop-start engine shutoff function, which Jaguar claims boosts economy by 5 percent.

The F-Type features bi-xenon headlights with integrated LED daytime running lights, along with full LED lighting at the rear. The S and V8 S versions come equipped with an "active exhaust system" which opens special valves over 3,000 rpm to intensify the sound profile.

There is a retractable rear wing and door handles that are left hidden with the bodywork until needed.

The audio systems offered, use Meridian technology with either 380 W spread across ten speakers or 770 W across twelve speakers.

Worldwide sales

Marketing and reception
In August 2012, it was announced that American singer-songwriter Lana Del Rey would be the face of the F-Type, which premiered at the Paris Motor Show in September 2012. The car won Car of The Year at the 2013 Middle East Motor Awards.

In April 2013 a short film called Desire was launched at the 2013 Sundance Film Festival to promote the Jaguar F-Type. Directed by Adam Smith from Ridley Scott Associates, starring Damian Lewis, Jordi Molla and Shannyn Sossamon.

As part of convertible launch celebration in the UK, Jaguar launched its #YourTurnBritain campaign; inviting people to share photos that encapsulate the best of modern Britain through Facebook, Twitter, Instagram or Tumblr. The best images submitted would win one of four unforgettable F-Type driving experiences. A fleet of Union Jack liveried F-Types embarked on a 'Best of British' promotional tour as part of the car's launch activity and Jaguar's #YourTurnBritain social media campaign, with the help of ambassadors Jamie Campbell Bower, Alice Temperley, MistaJam, Graeme Swann and Jimmy Anderson. The tour started in London in August 2013 and visited Leeds and Newcastle (12th), Edinburgh and Glasgow (13th), Manchester and Liverpool (14th), Sheffield, Nottingham and Birmingham (15th) Cardiff, Bristol and Oxford (16th). Londoners were able to see the cars from 12 to 23 August as they took residence at Canary Wharf.

David Gandy was featured in a film titled 'Escapism' featuring a Jaguar F-Type convertible.
In the film, Gandy gave the viewers insight into his life as he invited them on a road trip that started at dusk as he escaped 'the craziness of London'. David Gandy: Escapism features the style icon driving his favourite British heritage cars from the C-Type, E-Type and XKSS, through to the very latest F-Type. The film was previewed at the 2013 Goodwood Revival.

As part of F-Type coupé launch in the US, a 60-second TV commercial titled 'Rendezvous' was premiered the fourth quarter of Super Bowl XLVIII. In addition, a dozen New York City Subway trains were wrapped with ads advertising the F-TYPE in preparation for the Super Bowl XLVIII. On 2 February 2014, Jaguar unveiled the new coupé through a Super Bowl advertisement. The "British Villains" campaign (created by SPARK44, managed by Mindshare) captures the premise that Brits have long made the best villains in landmark films, combining intelligence with charm, restlessness with calm, and are always confident. Jaguar emphasised the idea that British were considered "bad" by Americans because of Hollywood movies always portraying villains to be British. Sir Ben Kingsley, Tom Hiddleston, and Mark Strong all support the villainous way of life as being good. Using these "villains" as the face of Jaguar helped support the edgy side of the luxury brand. This Super Bowl advertisement also challenged other luxury automotive markets in the US stating that Jaguar is just as edgy or maybe more than the other luxury automotive brands. The 'Rendezvous' commercial launched the campaign, which introduced the Jaguar F-Type Coupe and featured the campaign's unique hashtag, #GoodToBeBad. Following the 'Rendezvous' commercial premiere at Super Bowl XLVIII, 'The Set-Up' commercial was premiered on 12 January 2014 and the YouTube premiere of 'Rendezvous' on 28 January. "Rendezvous" was filmed by Hooper in London in a creative partnership with his Smuggler Films production house. The spot's original score for "Rendezvous" was composed and conducted by Alexandre Desplat and recorded by The London Symphony Orchestra at the Abbey Road studios. Jaguar also hosted the campaign page, www.BritishVillains.com, with information about the F-Type Coupé, the commercial and some unique video content including teasers starring each of the three actors. In addition to broadcast, the multi-channel campaign's Super Bowl efforts included unique outdoor creative throughout New York City, print, digital and consumer activations hosted with a wide array of media partners, and special events in the week leading up to the Super Bowl. The British Villains campaign continues with regularly updated content through July 2014.

As part of Jaguar F-Type Coupé launch in China, David Beckham joined Jaguar as a brand ambassador. The print creative material used in this campaign was produced by fashion photographer and filmmaker Peter Lindbergh.

The Jaguar F-Type Coupé has also been featured in singer Demi Lovato's Sorry Not Sorry music video and Nick Jonas's Find You music video.

Red Jaguar F-Type R Coupé has been featured in South Korean drama My Lovely Girl as car of main character portrayed by Korean singer/actor Rain. Drama was aired in South Korea on SBS from 17 September to 6 November 2014 on Wednesdays and Thursdays at 21:55 for 16 episodes (Jaguar F-type was featured from episode 3).

The coupe version of this car was used in the Amazon Prime Video show, The Grand Tour as the car during Celebrity Face Off.

Limited editions

400 Sport
The Jaguar F-Type 400 Sport, a special-edition model that would remain on sale for just one year, was launched as part of a raft of revisions to the British sports car.  
The F-Type 400 Sport features unique 20-inch alloy wheels.

The car features '400 Sport' badges on the front splitter and rear of the car, as well as the centre console, steering wheel, tread plates and embroidered headrests. The F-Type 400 is available as either a coupé or convertible and in either rear or all-wheel drive.

Project 7

The engine is shared with the F-Type SVR. Only up to 250 units were made and the car is considered to be Jaguar's most powerful production car ever, alongside the F-Type SVR. The body shell of the car is made from aluminium, reminiscing the historical D-Type LeMans winner. Visually, it features an 'Aero Haunch' behind the driver, similar to 1950s D-Type, a quad exhaust and a fixed rear spoiler.

The Project 7 is a skunkworks design penned by Italian-Brazilian designer César Pieri. It was discovered by chance when Pieri accidentally showed it to Jaguar chief-designer Ian Callum. The concept then became a functional prototype and eventually reached production.

References

External links

 International Jaguar F-TYPE Page
 USA Jaguar F-TYPE Page
 MENA Jaguar F-TYPE Page
Press kit:
 Jaguar F-TYPE Unveiled in Paris
 F-TYPE Coupé Makes Global Motor Show Debuts in Los Angeles and Tokyo

Coupés
Grand tourers
F-TYPE
Rear-wheel-drive vehicles
Roadsters
Cars introduced in 2013